Standard logic may refer to any of the following:

 Classical logic
 7400 series